A Military Unit Number (Russian: Войсковая часть) is a numeric alternate designation for military units in the armed forces and internal troops of post-Soviet states, originally used by those of the Soviet Union.

For ground forces the military unit number is assigned for a military unit (corps, division, brigade, etc.); for navy the military unit number is assigned for a single ship.

The number is also used for the unit's military mail.

Military Unit Number standards for post-Soviet states

References 
 

Military of the Soviet Union
Military of Ukraine
Military of Belarus
Military logistics of Russia